Brian L. Schmidt is a music composer for various video games and pinball machines.

Biography 
He began in the video game music and sound industry in 1987 as a composer/sound designer and programmer for Williams Electronic Games in Chicago writing music and creating sound effects for pinball machines and coin-operated video games.  In 1989, Schmidt left Williams to become one of the video game industry's first independent composer, sound designer and audio technologist under the company name of Schmidt Entertainment Technologies.  While a consultant, he worked on over 120 console and arcade games.  Schmidt is also the creator of the BSMT2000 audio DSP, which is used in various pinball games and video arcade machines and the QSound "Q1" 3D game sound chip used by CAPCOM. In 1998 Brian was recruited by Microsoft to become Program Manager for DirectSound and DirectMusic. From 1999–2008, Schmidt was the program manager of the Xbox Audio and Voice Technologies division at Microsoft and was responsible for much of the audio architecture for the Xbox and Xbox 360.  He created the start up sound for the original Xbox console, using 'old-school' techniques to create an 8-second sound using only 25 kilobytes of memory.  Brian is also credited with bringing real-time Digital Surround to video gaming with the inclusion of Dolby Digital Live on Xbox.

Schmidt was awarded the Lifetime Achievement Award from the Game Audio Network Guild (www.audiogang.org) in 2008 for his contributions to the game audio industry.  In 2017, he was inducted into the Pinball Expo Hall of Fame. His work has received numerous awards such as the Sega Seal of Quality award for "Best Sound"  and the Game Audio Network Guild's "Best new audio technology" awards. In 1989, his theme from the video game, NARC, was recorded and released by The Pixies.  Other game music by Brian is featured in the CD Box set, Legends of Game Music.  Brian also received the 2009 G.A.N.G. recognition award at the 2010 Game Developers Conference for his work founding GameSoundCon.

Brian received dual undergraduate degrees, a B.M. in Music and a BSc in computer science from Northwestern University in 1985, where he created the first dual degree program between the School of Music and the Technological Institute there. Following that in 1987, he received his master's degree entitled "Computer Applications in Music" also from Northwestern University.  Portions of his thesis were published in the Computer Music Journal in 1987.

Schmidt left Microsoft in February 2008, and formed Brian Schmidt Studios, L.L.C., an independent consulting firm. He is also the creator of GameSoundCon, a conference and seminar on composing video game music and video game sound design for the professional audio community.

Brian is also the Founder and Creative Director of EarGames, an independent video game development company specializing in audio games; videogames that rely on sound for gameplay.  EarGames initial release, Ear Monsters, was released in June 2013.

Schmidt's works

Pinball

Williams
Fire! (with Chris Granner and Rich Karstens)
Big Guns (with Chris Granner)
Space Station: Pinball Rendezvous
Banzai Run
Swords of Fury
Black Knight 2000 (with Dan Forden and Steve Ritchie)

Data East Pinball
King Kong (Pinball)
Back to the Future: The Pinball
The Simpsons
Checkpoint
Teenage Mutant Ninja Turtles
Batman
Star Trek: 25th Anniversary
Hook
Lethal Weapon 3
Star Wars
Rocky & Bullwinkle
Jurassic Park
Last Action Hero
Tales from the Crypt
The Who's Tommy: Pinball Wizard
WWF Royal Rumble
Guns N' Roses
Maverick
Aaron Spelling Custom Pinball (Which is actually a customized version of Lethal Weapon 3 made for Aaron Spelling)

Sega Pinball
Mary Shelley's Frankenstein
Baywatch
Batman Forever
Apollo 13
GoldenEye
Mini-Viper
Independence Day
Twister
Space Jam
The Lost World: Jurassic Park
Star Wars Trilogy
The X-Files
Starship Troopers
Viper Night Drivin
Lost In Space
Golden Cue
Godzilla
South Park
Harley Davidson

Stern Pinball
Game of Thrones Pinball (Music)
The Walking Dead Pinball (SFX)

Video games
Mutant Football League
Aaron vs. Ruth: Battle of the Bats (PC)
Carnivores: Dinosaur Hunter HD (additional SFX, Trailer)

Arcade
NARC (Williams; with Marc LoCascio)
Tattoo Assassins (Data East Pinball)

Sega Mega Drive/Genesis

Electronic Arts
Crüe Ball
Desert Strike: Return to the Gulf (with Rob Hubbard)
Jungle Strike
Mutant League Football
NBA Live 97
Super Baseball 2020
Toughman Contest (Genesis, 32x)
Bill Walsh College Football (1994)
PGA Tour 98 (Playstation)

Other developers
Weaponlord (Visual Concepts)
World Heroes (Sega Midwest Studio)
Zoop (Viacom New Media)
Congo
Star Trek: Starfleet Academy Starship Bridge Simulator (Interplay)
Sega NHL All-Star Hockey '95 (Genesis)
Blazing Dragons (video game) (PS1, Saturn Musical Arrangements & Dialogue)
Boot Sound (Original Xbox) (Microsoft)
Surf Ninjas (Game Gear)
Harley's Humongous Adventure (Visual Concepts)
GUTS (Nickelodeon, Viacom New Media)

Super Nintendo Entertainment System
Madden NFL '94 (Electronic Arts)
Madden NFL '95
Madden NFL '97
MechWarrior 3050
NBA Live 97 (Electronic Arts)
Weaponlord (Namco)
NHL '96 (Electronic Arts)

References

Interviews
Sonic Scoop
GamesSound
NextGen Audio Squareoff
Audio Spotlight

External links
Brian Schmidt Studios, LLC
MobyGames' info for Brian Schmidt

Living people
Video game composers
Microsoft employees
Musicians from Seattle
Northwestern University alumni
Pinball game designers
Bienen School of Music alumni
Year of birth missing (living people)